The qualifying for the 2015 Women's World Floorball Championships was played in January and February 2015. A total of 23 teams competed for fifteen spots. The final tournament will be organized by Finland in December 2015.

Overview
Numbers in brackets show the ranking before the qualification started, which is based on results from the last two World Championships. 

* Teams listed without a ranking are participating in their first Women´s World Floorball Championships and will receive a ranking after the final round event is played.

Europe
The qualification rules are as follows:
 The three best teams from each qualification group will qualify
 The two best fourth placed teams will qualify
 The classification of the fourth teams will follow this order:
 1. Average number of points 
 2. Average goal difference 
 3. Average scored goals
 4. Lottery drawing

European Qualification 1
Dates: 4 – 8 February 2015
Venue: Hala UAM Morasko, Poznań, Poland

European Qualification 2
Dates: 3 – 7 February 2015
Venue: Vidzeme´s Olympic Centre, Valmiera, Latvia

European Qualification 3
Dates: 4 – 8 February 2015
Venue: Arena Klokocina, Nitra, Slovakia

Ranking of fourth-placed teams
Since the number of teams between the qualification groups differ, the group sizes will be equalised by removing the results from the matches against the lowest placed teams in the larger-sized group before comparing the average results. The calculation of the fourth-placed teams will follow this order: 1. Average number of points 2. Average goal difference 3. Average scored goals 4. Lottery drawing.

Asia–Oceania
The qualification rules are as follows:
 The three best teams from the qualification group will qualify

Dates: 23 – 25 January 2015
Venue: Cardinia Life Arena,  Pakenham, Australia

Americas
The qualification rules are as follows:
 The best team from the qualification group will qualify

The calculation of the best team will follow this order: 1. Average number of points 2. Average goal difference 3. Average scored goals 4. Extra time + penalty shots.

Dates: 6 – 7 February 2015
Venue: Cornell Community Center, Markham, Canada

References

2015 Women's Qualifying
Women's World Floorball Championships qualifying
Women's World Floorball Championships qualifying
Women's World Floorball Championships qualifying
Women's World Floorball Championships qualifying
Women's World Floorball Championships qualifying
2015 in floorball